The Akaflieg Berlin B5 was a glider built in Germany in the late 1930s. It featured a high-wing, cantilever sailplane configuration of all-wood construction, with cantilevered gull-wings, retractable landing-gear, all-moving-tail, dive air-brakes.

Specifications (B5)

See also
List of gliders

References

1930s German sailplanes
Akaflieg Berlin aircraft
Aircraft first flown in 1937